{{DISPLAYTITLE:C2H4Br2}}
The molecular formula C2H4Br2 (molar mass: 187.86 g/mol, exact mass: 185.8680 u) may refer to:

 1,1-Dibromoethane (ethylidene dibromide)
 1,2-Dibromoethane, or ethylene dibromide (EDB)